Vera Sergeyevna Ilyina (born 20 February 1974) is a Russian diver who competed in the 1992 Summer Olympics, 1996 Summer Olympics, 2000 Summer Olympics and 2004 Summer Olympics.

Ilyina is the Olympic champion from Sydney, Australia in 2000 in the 3 m synchronized springboard with partner Yuliya Pakhalina.

Ilyina was born in Moscow.

She currently resides in Houston, United States.

References
sports-reference

1974 births
Living people
Russian female divers
Olympic divers of the Unified Team
Olympic divers of Russia
Divers at the 1992 Summer Olympics
Divers at the 1996 Summer Olympics
Divers at the 2000 Summer Olympics
Divers at the 2004 Summer Olympics
Olympic gold medalists for Russia
Olympic silver medalists for Russia
Divers from Moscow
Olympic medalists in diving
Medalists at the 2004 Summer Olympics
Medalists at the 2000 Summer Olympics
World Aquatics Championships medalists in diving
20th-century Russian women
21st-century Russian women